Jules Van Praet (2 July 1806 – 29 December 1887) was a Belgian diplomat and personal secretary of King Leopold I of Belgium. He was born in Bruges, and died in Brussels aged 81.

Honours 
 1853: Grand Cordon of the Imperial Order of Leopold  
 Knight Grand Cross in the Order of the White Eagle  
 Knight Grand Cross in the Order of Merit of Saxony  
 Knight Grand Cross in the Order of the Zähringer Lion  
 Knight Grand Cross in the Order of Saint Michael  
 Knight Grand Cross in the Legion of Honour  
 knight grand Cross in the Order of the Polar Star  
 knight Grand Cross in the Order of Charles III  
 knight Grand Cross in the Order of Saint Januarius  
 knight Grand Cross in the Order of Saint Joseph  
 knight Grand Cross in the Saxe-Ernestine House Order  
 Commander in the Saxe-Ernestine House Order  
 Commander in the Order of Saint Stephen of Hungary  
 Officer in the Order of the Tower and Sword  
 Order of Nichan, 2nd Class with Brilliants

References

External links

 Jules Van Praet
 Jules Van Praet

1806 births
1887 deaths
19th-century Belgian civil servants
People from Bruges
Belgian diplomats
Société Générale de Belgique
Dignitaries of the Belgian court
Ghent University alumni